Piqueriopsis is a genus of flowering plants in the tribe Eupatorieae within the family Asteraceae.

Species
There is only one known species, Piqueriopsis michoacana, known only from the State of Michoacán in western Mexico.

References

Eupatorieae
Monotypic Asteraceae genera
Flora of Michoacán